The Discovery of Grounded Theory  is a 1967 book by Barney Glaser and Anselm Strauss on grounded theory.

After their success with Awareness of Dying, Glaser and Strauss decided to write a book on methodology. The Discovery of Grounded Theory was meant to invite and motivate people to use the newly developed methodology. Unlike later works, it does not provide much advice on how to put the theory into practice.

The authors had several goals in mind when writing the book:
 Legitimize qualitative research. Having a reference book by established authors helped students defend qualitative studies which were not widely accepted at the time.
 Criticize functionalists like Talcott Parsons and his student Robert K. Merton who in turn had been a teacher of Barney Glaser.
 Demonstrate the possibility of building theories from data, something that many qualitative researchers doubt to this day, instead choosing to stick with mere ethnographic descriptions.

References
 Legewie, Heiner & Schervier-Legewie, Barbara (September 2004). "Forschung ist harte Arbeit, es ist immer ein Stück Leiden damit verbunden. Deshalb muss es auf der anderen Seite Spaß machen". Anselm Strauss interviewed by Heiner Legewie and Barbara Schervier-Legewie. Forum: Qualitative Social Research On-line Journal, 5(3), Art. 22.  Interview as MP3 audio (English) / edited German translation of interview. Accessed on May 20, 2005.
 Glaser, Barney G.  and Strauss, Anselm L.  (1967) The discovery of grounded theory: strategies for qualitative research.  Chicago.: Aldine.

1967 non-fiction books
Social sciences books
American non-fiction books
Collaborative non-fiction books